Mark Miller (born June 12, 1962) is a retired American soccer forward. A native of Tacoma, Washington, Miller attended the University of Portland where he played on the men’s soccer team under coach Clive Charles. Miller was on the team from 1981 to 1984. In 1985 and 1986, he played with F.C. Portland of the Western Soccer Alliance. In 1986, he was the league’s second leading scorer with 19 points on 7 goals and 5 assists. Teammate Brent Goulet won the points title that year with 20 points on 9 goals and 2 assists. While F.C. Portland ran to the second best record on Goulet and Miller’s scoring, the WSA named a champion based on regular season record only. The Hollywood Kickers therefore took the alliance title.

Miller later played with the Portland Timbers in 1989 and 1990.

 he coaches with the F.C. Portland youth club.

External links
 F.C. Portland youth club bio
 University of Portland alumni game with photo of Miller

1962 births
Living people
Soccer players from Tacoma, Washington
American soccer players
Western Soccer Alliance players
American Professional Soccer League players
Portland Timbers (1985–1990) players
University of Portland alumni
Portland Pilots men's soccer players
Association football forwards